Calvin O'Neale Purdin (February 22, 1921 – December 29, 1982) was an American football halfback.

Purdin was born in Jefferson, Oklahoma, in 1921 and attended Augusta High School in Augusta, Kansas. He played college football at Tulsa. He also competed in track and field for Tulsa.

He was selected by the Chicago Cardinals in the 25th round (233rd overall pick) of the 1943 NFL Draft. He played for the Cardinals during the 1943 season, appearing in four games.

In 1946, Purdin played in the All-America Football Conference for the Miami Seahawks and Brooklyn Dodgers.  He appeared in nine games, four of them as a starter.

In two seasons of professional football, he tallied 143 receiving yards and 32 rushing yards.

He died in 1982 in Augusta, Kansas.

References

1921 births
1982 deaths
American football halfbacks
Miami Seahawks players
Tulsa Golden Hurricane football players
Players of American football from Oklahoma
Tulsa Golden Hurricane men's track and field athletes